John Hargreaves (13 December 1860 – 13 January 1903) was an English international footballer who played as a winger.

Career
Born in Blackburn, Hargreaves attended Malvern College where he began playing football. He played for Blackburn Rovers between 1878 and 1884, playing in their FA Cup win in 1884 as well as taking a runner-up spot in the 1882 final. He made two appearances for England in 1881. England lost both games.

He worked as a solicitor from 1884.

His older brother was fellow Blackburn Rovers and England player Fred Hargreaves.

References

1860 births
1903 deaths
English footballers
England international footballers
Blackburn Rovers F.C. players
English Football League players
Association football midfielders
FA Cup Final players